SiS, formerly SiS: Janice & Gelli is a Philippine television talk show broadcast by GMA Network. Originally hosted by Gelli de Belen and Janice de Belen, it premiered on August 27, 2001. The show is the longest running morning talk show in Philippine television. The show concluded on January 1, 2010 with a total of 2,250 episodes. Gelli de Belen, Janice de Belen and Carmina Villarroel served as the final hosts. It was replaced by Kapuso Movie Festival in its timeslot.

Hosts
 Gelli de Belen 
 Janice de Belen 
 Carmina Villarroel 

Recurring hosts
 Marites "Tessbomb" Marañon 
 Eva Papaya 

Guest hosts
 Carmina Villarroel 
 Iza Calzado
 Lucy Torres
 Arnell Ignacio
 Christine Jacob
 Eugene Domingo

Ratings
According to AGB Nielsen Philippines' Mega Manila household television ratings, the final episode of SiS scored a 5.6% rating.

Accolades

PMPC Star Awards for Television
 2001–2006 Nominee, Best Celebrity Talk Show

Catholic Mass Media Awards
 2001–2006 Nominee, Best Talk Show

References

External links
 

2001 Philippine television series debuts
2010 Philippine television series endings
Filipino-language television shows
GMA Network original programming
Philippine television talk shows